Gnorimoschema gallaespeciosum is a moth in the family Gelechiidae. It was described by William E. Miller in 2000. It is found in North America, where it has been recorded from Minnesota and Alberta.

The larvae feed on Solidago speciosa.

References

Gnorimoschema
Moths described in 2000